The Seminole Heights Residential District, known also as the Seminole Heights Historic District, is a U.S. and Local Historic District located in Tampa, Florida. The district is roughly bounded by Hanna Avenue to the north, Cherokee Avenue and I-275 to the east, Florida Avenue to the west, and Osborne Avenue to the south.

National District 

Seminole Heights Residential District was designated a U.S. Historic District upon its inclusion in the National Register of Historic Places on August 5, 1993. The district encompasses , and includes 325 buildings identified as contributing structures based on their historical and architectural significance to the district.  Most of the buildings are private homes, but despite the "Residential" moniker, the district also includes public and community structures such as Seminole Heights United Methodist Church and Hillsborough High School.  The later two are examples of Gothic Revival style, one of the architectural styles for which the district is recognized.  Another style, which is represented in the neighborhood's numerous bungalows, is American Craftsman.  All the contributing buildings in Seminole Heights Historic District date from the early 20th century, and the district is noted for historical significance from the period of 1912 - 1928.

The historic district is a part of the city's Old Seminole Heights neighborhood, one of three distinct neighborhoods within the greater Seminole Heights section of Tampa.  Old Seminole Heights is home to two nationally recognized historic districts, of which Seminole Heights Residential District was the first.  Hampton Terrace Historic District received its designation in 1999.

Local District 

In addition to its status at the national level, Seminole Heights Historic District was declared a Local Historic District by the City of Tampa Architectural Review Commission on March 16, 1995. It is one of four Local Historic Districts within the city, and the only one in Seminole Heights.  Local district boundaries cover the same area defined by the national district, between Hanna and Osborne Avenues, and Florida and Cherokee Avenues/I-275.  Unlike the rough pattern followed by the national district, the local boundaries are absolute, thus including a slightly larger area and approximately 26 additional historic buildings. The Local District adds a second area east of I-275 which is bounded north to south by Henry and Hillsborough Avenues, and by the properties on both sides of Miami Avenue in the east to Taliaferro Avenue in the west.  Approximately 28 historic structures are included in this smaller addition.

References

External links

 Hillsborough County listings at National Register of Historic Places
 Map of Seminole Heights Historic District

Houses on the National Register of Historic Places in Hillsborough County, Florida
National Register of Historic Places in Tampa, Florida
Historic districts on the National Register of Historic Places in Florida
Bungalow architecture in Florida
Gothic Revival architecture in Florida
1993 establishments in Florida